The Man Who Planted Trees (French title: L'homme qui plantait des arbres) is a short story published in 1953 by French author Jean Giono. An allegorical tale, it tells the story of one shepherd's long and successful single-handed effort to re-forest a desolate valley in the foothills of the Alps in Provence throughout the first half of the 20th century. It was written in French, but first published in English.

Plot
The story begins in the year 1913, when a young man who is the narrator was travelling alone on a hiking trip through Provence, France, and into the Alps, enjoying the relatively unspoiled wilderness. He runs out of water in a treeless, desolate valley where only wild lavender grows and there is no trace of civilization except old, empty crumbling buildings. He finds only a dried-up well, but is saved by a middle-aged shepherd who takes him to a spring he knows of.

Curious about this man and why he has chosen such a lonely life, the narrator stays with him for a time. The shepherd, Elzéard Bouffier, after being widowed, decided to restore the ruined landscape of the isolated and largely abandoned valley by single-handedly cultivating a forest, by planting acorns. He makes holes in the ground with his straight iron staff and drops into them acorns that collected from miles away. He is also growing beech and birch saplings for planting.

The narrator leaves the shepherd, returns home, and later fights in the First World War. In 1920, shell-shocked and depressed after the war, the man returns. He is surprised to see young saplings of all forms taking root in the valley, and new streams running through it, where the trees are changing the climate. The narrator makes a full recovery in the peace and beauty of the regrowing valley, and continues to visit the region and M. Bouffier every year. He finds on one visit that Bouffier is no longer a shepherd, because of the sheep eating his young trees, and has become a bee keeper instead.

The valley receives official protection after the First World War, with the French authorities mistakenly believing that the rapid growth of the new forest is a bizarre natural phenomenon, as they are unaware of Bouffier's selfless deeds. Over three decades, Bouffier continues to plant trees, and the valley is turned into a kind of Garden of Eden. By the end of the story, the valley is vibrant with life and is peacefully settled, with more than 10,000 people living there, not knowing they owe their happiness to Bouffier. The narrator tells one of his friends, a government forester, the truth about the new forest, and the friend also helps to protect it.

In 1945, the narrator visits the now very old Bouffier one last time. In 1947, in a hospice in Banon, the man who planted trees peacefully passes away.

Background
The story itself is said to have had such an effect on readers that many have believed that Elzéard Bouffier was a genuine historical figure and that the narrator of the story was a young Jean Giono himself, and that the tale is part autobiographical. Giono did live during this time, and while he was alive Giono enjoyed allowing people to believe that the story was real, and considered it as a tribute to his skill. His daughter, Aline Giono, described it as "a family story for a long time." However, Giono himself explained in a 1957 letter to an official of the city of Digne:Sorry to disappoint you, but Elzéard Bouffier is a fictional person. The goal was to make trees likeable, or more specifically, make planting trees likeable. In the letter, he describes how the book was translated in a multitude of languages, distributed freely, and therefore was a success. He adds that, although "it does not bring me a cent", it is one of the texts of which he is most proud.

Adaptations

It was adapted as an animated short by Frédéric Back and released in 1987. It earned a number of awards including an Academy Award for Best Animated Short Film.
In 2006, it was adapted for the stage and puppets by Richard Medrington of "Puppet State Theatre Company" in Edinburgh, Scotland.
In 2020, it was the inspiration for composer Noah Max's String Quartet No. 1: The Man Who Planted Trees, which features a narrator reading an abridged version of Giono's story.

Spoken-word recordings
In 1985 the Paul Winter Consort recorded an album with Robert J. Lurtsema as the narrator. It was made into a book-on-tape in 1990 by Earth Music Productions. In 1992, the American radio show Hearts of Space did a musically-accompanied reading (episode 290, first aired on 15 May) with narration by Robert J. Lurtsema. It has also been recorded for BBC Radio 4 with Bill Paterson narrating.

Related works
The original book has inspired a 2012 book on the same theme:
The Man Who Planted Trees: Lost Groves, Champion Trees, and an Urgent Plan to Save the Planet by Jim Robbins. Robbins work cites Giono's work and goes on to consider the modern-day work of David Milarch, a Michigan nurseryman.

Environmentalist and silvologist Gabriel Hemery wrote a sequel in 2016 titled: The Man Who Harvested Trees and Gifted Life. The short story follows a girl's life-long relationship with a forest and its trees.

See also
 Green Mountain
 Ferdinand Larose
 Johnny Appleseed
 Jadav Payeng
 Willie Smits
 Akira Miyawaki

References

External links
 The Man Who Planted Trees (English Translation by Peter Doyle)
 L'homme qui plantait des arbres (Original French version)

Fiction set in 1913
Fiction set in 1920
Fiction set in 1945
Fiction set in 1947
1953 short stories
French short stories
Allegory
Works by Jean Giono
Short stories set in France
Short stories adapted into films